Mecistocephalus simplex is a species of centipede in the Mecistocephalidae family. It is endemic to Australia, and was first described in 1920 by American biologist Ralph Vary Chamberlin.

Description
The original description of this species is based on a specimen measuring 40 mm in length. This species has 49 pairs of legs.

Distribution
The species occurs in coastal north-eastern Queensland. The type locality is Cairns.

Behaviour
The centipedes are solitary terrestrial predators that inhabit plant litter and soil.

References

 

 
simplex
Centipedes of Australia
Endemic fauna of Australia
Fauna of Queensland
Animals described in 1920
Taxa named by Ralph Vary Chamberlin